Kiralee M. Hayashi is an American stunt woman, actress, and gymnast.

She is known for her work on The Twilight Saga: Breaking Dawn – Part 2, Transformers: Age of Extinction, and The Book of Eli.

Background 
Hayashi was born and raised in Hawaii.
She is of Japanese, Portuguese, English & Irish descent.
Her success as a gymnast gained her a full scholarship to UCLA,
where she studied neuroscience.

Academia 
While at UCLA she did research in the Paul Thompson's group at Laboratory of Neuro Image (LONI).
She co-authored several papers on neuroscience topics.

She has a low Erdős number of just three  through the publication Brain surface parameterization using Riemann surface structure which was coauthored by Shing-Tung Yau.
Yau published On sampling Markov chains together with Ronald Graham,
and Graham authored On Sum of Fibonacci Numbers together with Paul Erdős.

Gymnastics 
While at UCLA she was also a notable gymnast. One of the most highly recruited freshmen her graduating year. She garnered 9 All-American titles (both first and second team). And was a National Balance Beam champion. She was Pac-10 gymnast of the year in 1999 and Pac-10 Conference Medalist for 1998-99, her senior year. And was a two-time Pac-10 All-Academic selection. Hayashi was a finalist for the AAI American Award, given annually to the nation's most outstanding all-around senior gymnast.

Filmography

Films

Television

Notes

References

External links 
 
 

American stunt performers
Living people
American actresses
American female artistic gymnasts
Year of birth missing (living people)
University of California, Los Angeles alumni
American neuroscientists
American women neuroscientists
People from Hawaii
American actresses of Japanese descent
21st-century American women
UCLA Bruins women's gymnasts